Ádám Korányi (born July 13, 1932, in Szeged) is a Hungarian and American mathematician. He is a Distinguished Professor of Mathematics and Computer Science at Lehman College, City University of New York and at the CUNY Graduate Center. His research interests include complex analysis,  harmonic analysis, and quasiconformal mappings.



Life and career
Korányi earned his doctorate in 1959 from the University of Chicago under the supervision of Marshall Stone.
He has been an external member of the Hungarian Academy of Sciences since 2001.

Korányi advised 7 doctoral students, including Howard L. Resnikoff.

Selected publications

References

1932 births
20th-century American mathematicians
20th-century Hungarian mathematicians
21st-century American mathematicians
21st-century Hungarian mathematicians
Living people
People from Szeged
University of Chicago alumni
Members of the Hungarian Academy of Sciences
City University of New York faculty
Graduate Center, CUNY faculty
Lehman College faculty
Complex analysts